The English cricket team toured Zimbabwe for a four-match One Day International (ODI) series between 16 February and 23 February 2000. England won the ODI series 3–0 after the fourth match was abandoned without a ball bowled.

ODI series

1st ODI

2nd ODI

3rd ODI

4th ODI

References

External links

2000 in English cricket
2000 in Zimbabwean cricket
International cricket competitions from 1997–98 to 2000
1999-2000
Zimbabwean cricket seasons from 1980–81 to 1999–2000